The Av8er Explorer is a British paramotor that was designed by Paul Taylor and produced by Av8er Limited of Woodford Halse, Northamptonshire for powered paragliding. Now out of production, when it was available the aircraft was supplied complete and ready-to-fly.

Design and development
The Explorer was designed to comply with the US FAR 103 Ultralight Vehicles rules as well as European regulations. It features a paraglider-style wing, single-place accommodation and a single engine in pusher configuration. The aircraft is built with special attention to balancing and vibration isolation. The cage assembly includes small wheels to ease ground movement of the motor unit.

As is the case with all paramotors, take-off and landing is accomplished by foot. Inflight steering is accomplished via handles that actuate the canopy brakes, creating roll and yaw.

Variants
Explorer XPE
Model with a  Hirth F33 engine in pusher configuration with a 2.2:1 ratio reduction drive and a  diameter two-bladed wooden propeller.

Specifications (Explorer XPE)

References

Explorer
2000s British ultralight aircraft
Single-engined pusher aircraft
Paramotors